Garcia Elementary School may refer to:
 Alfred F. Garcia Elementary School, a K-8 school in Phoenix, Arizona formerly operated by the Murphy Elementary School District
 Dr. Ernest Garcia Elementary School, Colton, California, Rialto Unified School District
 Hector P. Garcia Elementary School, Grand Prairie, Texas, Grand Prairie Independent School District
 Macario Garcia Elementary School, Houston, Texas, Houston Independent School District
 Hector P. Garcia Elementary School, Temple, Texas, Temple Independent School District